Christian Bottollier (25 July 1928 – 1 July 2021) was a French footballer who played as a forward or midfielder.

Biography
In 1949, he was recruited to play for FC Nancy as a forward. With Nancy, he was a finalist for the Coupe de France in 1953. However, he retired in 1958 following a serious knee injury.

Christian Bottollier died in Saint-Max on 1 July 2021 at the age of 92.

References

1928 births
2021 deaths
French footballers
FC Nancy players
Sportspeople from Marne (department)
Association football forwards
Association football midfielders
Footballers from Grand Est